Rhyopsocus eclipticus is a species of bird nest barklouse in the family Psoquillidae. It is found in North America and Europe.

References

Trogiomorpha
Articles created by Qbugbot
Insects described in 1876